The Visitation is a c. 1517 painting of the Visitation of the Virgin Mary to Saint Elizabeth by Raphael,  in the Prado Museum since 1837. Commissioned by the Apostolic Protonotary Giovanni Branconio at his father Marino's request for their family chapel in the church of San Silvestre in Aquila (Marino's wife was called Elisabeth), it was plundered by the occupation troops of Philip IV of Spain in 1655 and placed at El Escorial.

See also
List of paintings by Raphael

Notes

References

External links
Prado catalogue entry

1517 paintings
Paintings of the Madonna and Child by Raphael
Paintings of the Museo del Prado by Italian artists
Raphael
Pregnancy in art